Jeremy Lindsay Taylor (born Sydney, 19 September 1973) is an Australian actor.

Education
He finished his education at Newington College in 1991 and graduated with a Bachelor of Arts degree, with a major in drama and sociology, from the University of Newcastle. He was a first grade cricketer and Rugby player at school. He was considered to be one of Newington College's finest medium pace seamers of all time.

Acting career
He is known for his long-running role as Kurt Peterson in Heartbreak High. Since then he has appeared in Something in the Air, McLeod's Daughters, Stingers and Blue Heelers. In 2006, he guest-starred in the Doctor Who audio adventure The Reaping. Taylor appeared in the feature films Tom White and Em4Jay and Bad Bush. His theatre credits include the Melbourne Theatre Company's Take Me Out. In 2007, Taylor co-starred with Lisa McCune, Ian Stenlake, Saskia Burmeister, John Batchelor, Matt Holmes, Jay Ryan, Kristian Schmid, Kirsty Lee Allan, and David Lyons in the hit Australian drama Sea Patrol. He portrayed Petty Officer Pete Tomaszewski ("Buffer") in 39 episodes from 2007–2009. Taylor joined the cast of Canal Road in Series 1, Episode 9 as Cain Harvey in 2008. In 2009, he appeared the UK.TV mini-series False Witness. He starred in Underbelly: Razor on the Nine Network and in Network Ten's Bikie Wars: Brothers in Arms. In 2012, Taylor starred in Network Ten's Australian coming of age series Puberty Blues as Martin Vickers and he returned to the show for a second series in 2014. In 2013 he appeared in HBO Asia's Serangoon Road. It was announced in August 2015 that he would play new character detective Dylan Carter in a recurring role on the Seven Network soap opera Home and Away. He began appearing on Home and Away from the twenty-ninth season in 2016.

Filmography

Film

Television

See also
 Wild Boys

References

External links

 
 Sea Patrol Official Website 

1973 births
Living people
Australian male television actors
Australian male stage actors
Male actors from Sydney
People educated at Newington College
University of Newcastle (Australia) alumni